In the AFL Women's (AFLW), the Western Bulldogs best and fairest award is awarded to the best and fairest player at the Western Bulldogs during the home-and-away season. The award has been awarded annually since the competition's inaugural season in 2017, and Ellie Blackburn and Emma Kearney were the joint inaugural winners of the award.

Recipients

See also

 Charles Sutton Medal (list of Western Bulldogs best and fairest winners in the Australian Football League)

References

AFL Women's awards
Lists of AFL Women's players
   
Awards established in 2017